Hexad ('group of 6') or hexade may refer to:

Hexad (musical formation), or sextet
Hexad (chord), a six-note series
Hexad (computing), a 6-bit group

See also

6
Sextet (disambiguation)
Pentad (disambiguation) ('group of 5')
Heptad (disambiguation) ('group of 7')